Lilian Doris Thompson  (née Bean; 12 January 1903 – 23 June 2004) was a British businessperson who was the managing director and chairman of Blackpool Pleasure Beach.

Career highlights
Doris Thompson became a director at Blackpool Pleasure Beach in 1929, immediately after the death of her father, whilst her husband, Leonard Thompson became managing director and chairman. Whilst she initially focused on her young family, she gradually, behind the scenes, assisted more and more in the development of the park, especially throughout the 1930s which saw the opening of the Fun House, Grand National and the introduction of the famous ice show.

When Leonard Thompson died in 1976, Doris Thompson succeeded him as chairman of the Pleasure Beach, whilst her son Geoffrey Thompson became managing director. She enjoyed her role in the development and running of the park hugely, and could often be found donning her headscarf and hurtling around the latest ride. In 1979, she rode the Revolution 360-degree looping coaster, having first had a full medical check-up. Almost 25 years later, she rode her final ride, the Spin Doctor at the age of 99 years.

Education
Doris Thompson was educated locally in Blackpool, and then at Malvern Ladies' College in Worcestershire. In 1928 Doris married Leonard Thompson, "a bright, ambitious, Oxford-educated businessman". He worked for the Swedish Match Company and the couple were content to begin married life in London. However, within 12 months, the death of William Bean while on a Mediterranean cruise threw their plans into disarray. The couple decided to return to Blackpool to try to keep her father's dream alive. While Doris became a director, Leonard became chairman and managing director of Blackpool Pleasure Beach, roles that continued for almost 50 years.

Personal life
Doris Thompson married Leonard Thompson in 1928, at the age of 25. She had three children, Geoffrey, Mary Louise and Carol Jean.

For relaxation she escaped to the European continent in her Rolls-Royce – "a present from myself, to myself". Doris rarely missed a day in the office and presided over business meetings with the physical and mental energy of a woman half her age. She regularly featured among the top fifty richest women in England.

In 1948, tragedy struck the Thompson family when Doris and Leonard's elder daughter, Mary Louise, was on her way to study in America before taking up a place at Oxford University. As her plane came into land at Shannon Airport in dense fog, it hit a wall and burst into flames. Thirty passengers were killed, including Mary Louise.

She was appointed MBE in 1969 and OBE in 2003.

Death
Doris Thompson died on 23 June 2004 on the day of her late son, Geoffrey Thompson's funeral. She reached the age of 101 and had been appointed an OBE and MBE for her contribution to tourism.

References

1903 births
Blackpool Pleasure Beach
2004 deaths
People from Great Yarmouth
English centenarians
Women centenarians
20th-century English businesspeople